This is a list of telephone dialling codes in the United Kingdom, which adopts an open telephone numbering plan for its public switched telephone network. The national telephone numbering plan is maintained by Ofcom, an independent regulator and competition authority for the UK communications industries. This list is based on the official standard, but includes defunct codes and historical changes, including the derivation of the two letter identities, in cases where known. Dialling codes do not correspond to specific political boundaries: for example, the Coventry dialling code covers a large area of Warwickshire and the Manchester dialling code covers part or all of several neighbouring towns.

When dialling within the country, all area codes are preceded by the national trunk prefix 0, which has been included in all listings in this article. 0 was traditionally the number dialled for the operator for trunk calls before subscriber trunk dialling (STD) was introduced and so was retained as a prefix for direct-dialled calls. In the majority of areas, the area code still corresponds to the original STD letter code.  When dialling from abroad, the 0 prefix is not dialled. When dialling within the same area, the area code is not needed, save for a handful of areas that do require this. When calling from a mobile telephone, the area code is always needed.

Code prefixes

List of dialling codes

For an explanation of the two-letter STD codes used below, see Introduction of area codes.

ELNS denotes Extended Linked Numbering Scheme areas, where an area code is associated with more than one place name.

01426, 01523 and other non-standard 01 prefixes were briefly used for pagers in the late 1990s and then moved to new 076 prefixes in the Big Number Change in 2000/2001.

In several area codes, a block of 1,000 numbers is set aside for use as fictional numbers for drama.

Code length
The length of the area code part and the local number part is found as follows:

The number format '2+8' refers to, e.g. London, numbers using the (020) xxxx xxxx format.

The number format '5+4' refers to, e.g. Brampton, numbers using the (0169 77) xxxx format.

Areas with mandatory area code dialling
In the following areas, the area code must be included when dialling local numbers. This enables local numbers to start with 0 or 1 and was introduced to increase the number of available telephone numbers within these areas.

Overseas Territories
Unlike the Crown Dependencies of Jersey, Guernsey and the Isle of Man which use the UK area codes 01534, 01481 and 01624, respectively, telephone numbers in British Overseas Territories do not come under the UK telephone numbering plan. Some are within the North American Numbering Plan (NANP). These calls are treated as international calls. Below are the access codes for the overseas territories:

North American Numbering Plan
 Anguilla +1 (264)
 Bermuda +1 (441)
 British Virgin Islands +1 (284)
 Cayman Islands +1 (345)
 Montserrat +1 (664)
 Turks and Caicos Islands +1 (649)

Others
 British Antarctic Territory +44 (shared with the UK)
 British Indian Ocean Territory +246
 Falkland Islands and South Georgia and the South Sandwich Islands +500
 Gibraltar +350
 Saint Helena and Tristan da Cunha +290
 Tristan da Cunha also uses +44 (0)20
 Ascension Island +247
 Akrotiri and Dhekelia +357 (shared with Cyprus)
 Pitcairn Islands +64 (shared with New Zealand)

Notes

References

External links
  – includes National Telephone Numbering Plan
  – patterns for checking which area codes and prefixes are valid and patterns for formatting each number type, archived in 2014
  – detailed information and explanation
  – detailed list with many additional comments

Telephone numbers in the United Kingdom
Telephone dialling codes
United Kingdom